Prelog ( Kajkavian: Prilok) is a town in Međimurje County, in northern Croatia. The total population of the town is 4,042, with 7,027 in the town's administrative area, making it the second most populated settlement in the county, after Čakovec.

The town is located in the southern part of Međimurje County, on the shores of the Drava River and Lake Dubrava, a reservoir on the river. The town is located 16 kilometres of the county's capital Čakovec, to which it is connected by D20 state road.

Population
The town's administrative area includes the following settlements:

 Cirkovljan, population 694
 Čehovec, population 634
 Čukovec, population 257
 Draškovec, population 539
 Hemuševec, population 224
 Oporovec, population 334
 Otok, population 303
 Prelog, population 4,042

History

Beginnings
Prelog was first mentioned on 6 December 1264, and that date is celebrated with a local festival. The name Prelog is probably derived from the Croatian word vlak, meaning the train, pulling, or to pull, since the area attracted many visitors who intentionally came and eventually passed by in the process of transit and trade.

The place was obviously well managed and organised, so that the king of Croats and Hungarians, Matthias Corvinus, was stationed here with his army in 1480. It was a trade centre when the Zrinski family of rulers (Nikola Zrinski, Petar Zrinski, etc.) controlled the region. In 1671, Petar Zrinski was accused of treason and executed. After that, the population of Prelog decreased due to fear and suspicion of foreign German armies present nearby.

Growth

In 1716, however, the population started to grow. Shops were crowded with merchants, travellers and other busy people. The town became a centre for the distribution of rock salt for this part of the kingdom. There was also a silk plant, so-called filandra, which would eventually close in 1848.

The beautiful baroque Church of St. James was built in 1761, in the heyday of the town. Towards the end of the 18th century, Prelog was the most developed municipality in the present-day Međimurje region. In 1786, it was significantly bigger than Čakovec. At the time, it had a population of 1,729, while the population of Čakovec was 1,048.

During the 19th and 20th centuries
Strangely enough, Prelog did not benefit much from the first railroad, built in 1860, which reached westbound of Kotoriba, and ultimately reached Budapest and Rijeka. The town was simply slightly offset, only indirectly connected, and unable to benefit properly from the new means of transport.

A long period of industrial stagnation ensued. The first bank opened in 1873, and another one followed in 1905. By the end of the 19th century, the number of residents was around 4,100. The town was the seat of the Prelog district of Zala County in the Kingdom of Hungary until the Treaty of Trianon was signed in 1920.

In the first half of the 20th century, the marginalisation of Prelog continued. It was relieved of its previous administrative functions. During World War II, it was part of Hungary again, as the entire Međimurje region was annexed by the Hungarians between 1941 and 1945.

Čakovec then overtook Prelog. However, it soon regained its confidence and began to grow again, receiving the town status from the Croatian Parliament in February 1997, five years after the country's independence.

Economy and education
Today, more than 50% of the income is based on industry and manufacturing. Agriculture accounts for approximately 19% of the income, while a quarter of it is based on commerce and tourism.

Prelog's elementary school is attended by more than 500 pupils. There is also a secondary school in the town, the only in Međimurje County that is not located in Čakovec. The secondary school offers education for jobs in tourism, catering and food processing. It is attended by more than 400 students in study courses lasting three years.

Sports and recreation
Prelog is considered the hometown of motorcycle speedway in Croatia, as the local speedway club was one of the country's first organised clubs in the sport.

There are more than 20 different sports clubs in the town and its wider area, with the most popular sports including football, tennis, basketball, table tennis, handball, etc. There is also a small airfield for powered hang gliders on the shores of the Drava, as well as a small marina on Lake Dubrava nearby, with the lake also being a popular destination for anglers.

Culture
Prelog is home to a monument to the Croatian ban Josip Jelačić.

References

External links

  

Populated places in Međimurje County
 
Cities and towns in Croatia
13th-century establishments in Croatia